Isolados is a 2014 Brazilian horror thriller film directed by Tomas Portella, starring Bruno Gagliasso, Regiane Alves and José Wilker. Shot in the inner Rio de Janeiro state during three weeks, the film is the last work of actor José Wilker, who died on April 5, 2014. It was premiered on August 8 at the 2014 Festival de Gramado.

The film follows the story of a couple who, after moving to an isolated house, begins to feel threatened by several violent stories that surrounds the location.

Plot
The film tells the story of Lauro, a young psychiatrist who fell in love with his former patient Renata. One day, they decide to travel to the mountains in search of tranquillity, without knowing that the site houses a serial killer couple, which are targeting women in the region. Isolated, they will have to fight alone for their lives.

Cast
 Bruno Gagliasso as Lauro
 Regiane Alves as Renata
 José Wilker as Dr. Fausto
 Juliana Alves as Luzia
 Orã Figueiredo as Clóvis
 Silvio Guindane as Augusto

References

External links
 

2014 horror thriller films
2014 films
Brazilian horror thriller films
Films shot in Rio de Janeiro (state)
Brazilian independent films
2014 horror films
2014 independent films
2010s Portuguese-language films